Javier "Javi" Hernández Tarroc (born 14 September 2000) is a Spanish footballer who plays as a central defender for Deportivo Aragón.

Club career
Hernández was born in Zaragoza, Aragón, and was a Real Zaragoza youth graduate. He made his senior debut with the reserves on 28 October 2018, starting in a 5–1 Tercera División home routing of SD Borja.

Hernández scored his first senior goal on 14 April 2019, netting the opener in a 4–1 home success over CD Binéfar. He made his first team debut on 16 December of the following year, starting in a 2–0 away win against Gimnástica de Torrelavega, for the season's Copa del Rey.

Hernández made his professional debut on 5 January 2021, coming on as a late substitute for Alberto Guitián in a 1–2 loss at AD Alcorcón, also in the national cup.

References

External links

2000 births
Living people
Footballers from Zaragoza
Spanish footballers
Association football defenders
Segunda División players
Tercera División players
Tercera Federación players
Real Zaragoza B players
Real Zaragoza players